PAL Airlines (formerly Provincial Airlines) is a Canadian regional airline with headquarters at St. John's International Airport in St John's, Newfoundland and Labrador, Canada. PAL operates scheduled passenger, cargo, air ambulance and charter services. PAL is the commercial airline arm of the PAL Group of Companies. In addition to its head office, it also has bases in Halifax, Nova Scotia (Halifax Stanfield International Airport), Happy Valley-Goose Bay (CFB Goose Bay), and Montreal, Quebec (Montréal-Pierre Elliott Trudeau International Airport). PAL is the second largest regional airline operator in Eastern Canada next to Jazz Aviation.

History 
The airline was established in August 1974 as a flight training and charter operator. Scheduled airline operations began in 1980. In the 1980s, the company also developed its airborne maritime surveillance division, which operated until 1989 as Atlantic Airways. In 1988, it acquired Eastern Flying Service (established in 1956 and operating an extensive air courier network and charter services). From 1995 to 1997 it used the brand Interprovincial Airlines to operate scheduled regional airline services in a commercial agreement with Air Nova. The Provincial Airlines brand was restored in 1997 to enhance network growth and focus on regional air transport needs. In 1988 PAL Airlines joined with the Innu Development Limited Partnership, to establish Innu Mikun Airlines, which grew to be the largest Labrador based air carrier providing charter services throughout Labrador and scheduled airline services to coastal Labrador communities. In 2017 PAL Airlines, Innu Development LP, and NGC Nunatsiavut established Air Borealis through a merger of Innu Mikun Airlines and Air Labrador to enhance indigenous aviation, expand and improve regional transportation infrastructure, and foster community economic growth.

In its early years, the company operated light aircraft such as the Piper Navajo and the Britten-Norman Islander around Atlantic Canada. In 1988, the company introduced Fairchild Metroliners, initially for courier services and in 1989 in scheduled passenger services, eventually building one of the larger Metro fleets through the success of the aircraft in building regional air passenger traffic. From 1996 to 1998, it operated a Convair 580 for courier and cargo services. In 1995 the first DHC-6 Twin Otters were purchased for services in Labrador. In 2001, PAL took the delivery of its first Saab 340 aircraft. This meant that PAL Airlines had become a 705 carrier, as per the Canadian Aviation Regulations, maintained by  Transport Canada, and thus the first class of flight attendants were trained at this time. The airline added to its 705 fleet three years later when the company was awarded the Vale Canada contract for the Voisey's Bay Mine in Labrador. This contract required the use of De Havilland Canada Dash 8s which began to arrive in 2004. Provincial eventually added more Dash 8s as part of the airline's scheduled air service.

On 12 March 2009, one of PAL Aerospace's Maritime Patrol Aircraft was first on the scene of Cougar Helicopters Flight 91's ditching, flying "top cover" until other help could arrive, leading to the rescue of the sole survivor.

Between 2011 and 2012, the company divided into two operating segments. Remaining under the same ownership, two separate corporate divisions were formed: PAL Aerospace and PAL Airlines. Provincial Aerospace remains as the parent company. PAL Aerospace is an international aerospace and defence contractor with maritime patrol and intelligence, surveillance, and reconnaissance operations in Canada, Curaçao, under contract to the Netherlands Ministry of Defence, and the United Arab Emirates. The Cessna Citation jets, and the charter and MEDIVAC King Airs are also operated by PAL Aerospace. PAL Aerospace is a speciality operator (Part 702, 703, and 704). PAL Aerospace has the MRO operations providing integration, modification, and maintenance and overhaul services. PAL Airlines is focused on regional airline operations with 704 and 705 aircraft which in 2011 comprised Dash-8s, Twin Otters, and a Metroliner, at four bases in St. John's, Halifax, Goose Bay, and Montreal.

In November 2014, the company was purchased by Exchange Income Corporation, a Toronto Stock Exchange (TSX)-listed stock that owns regional airlines and several manufacturing companies, for a combination of cash and stock worth about $246 million.

In June 2017, PAL Airlines established Air Borealis LP in partnership with the Innu, the First Nations people of Labrador (through Innu Development LP) and the government of Nunatsiavut (through the Nunatsiavut Group of Companies). Air Borealis operates a large fleet of Series 300 Twin Otter in regional airline and charter operations in Labrador. In 2020, Air Borealis established a rotary wing division providing charter helicopter services throughout Labrador.

Bases and operations

PAL Airlines bases

St. John's International Airport: PAL operates Dash 8s, King Airs, Beechcraft 1900s as well as aircraft from the aerospace side of the company out of St. John's. PAL Airlines operates two hangars in St. John's and shares one (Hangar 2 with the aerospace division). Hangar 2 houses Dash 8s and the Metroliner. Hangar 3 holds Dash 8 maintenance as well as the commissary department. Hangar 4 houses a number of departments including human resources, reservations, training, building maintenance, chief pilot and Fisheries and Oceans Canada (DFO) of PAL Airlines, flight attendant management, crew room, crew scheduling, dispatch, and System Operational Control Centre (SOCC), and PAL Cargo are also attached to Hangar 4. Hangar 4 can also be rented to store aircraft. A Shell Canada, PAL owned fixed-base operator (FBO) is located at the St. John's International Airport in Hangar 4.

Halifax Stanfield International Airport: PAL operates one hangar in Halifax, which houses a Dash 8. This hangar is shared with the Aerospace Division and its aircraft as well. PAL also operates an Esso Avitat FBO at this hangar. The hangar also has management offices and a crew room.

Goose Bay Airport: Goose Bay is home to PAL Airlines Twin Otter operation under the name of Air Borealis. PAL owns two hangars in Goose Bay. Hangar 14 houses the aircraft groomers, aircraft maintenance for Twin Otters (all PAL aircraft can be serviced in Goose Bay), crew room and dispatch. Hangar 18 in Goose Bay houses the Voisey's Bay check-in desk for the daily charter the Dash 8 provides to Voisey's Bay Aerodrome at the Voisey's Bay Mine in Voisey's Bay, northern Labrador. PAL Cargo, Air Borealis charters and management offices are also in Hangar 18.

Montréal–Trudeau International Airport: PAL Airlines operates from the Starlink Aviation hangar at Montreal's Trudeau airport. The hangar houses Dash 8s for scheduled and charter service throughout Quebec.

PAL Aerospace bases

St. John's International Airport: Hangars 1 and 6 in St. John's are owned by Provincial Aerospace. Hangar 2 houses the Cessna Citation II MEDIVAC, and four Maritime Surveillance (AMSD) King Air 200's. It is shared with the airline division's Dash 8s and Metroliner. Hangar 2 also has the offices of the chief pilot of the AMSD Division, other managers and part of the IT department. Hangar 1 houses the Cessna Citation X and the office of the chief pilot of the jet division and DFO of PAL Aerospace). It also accommodates a Shell FBO and executive offices. The training department for both Aerospace and Airlines is also located in Hangar 1. Hangar 6 is home to PMMD, Provincial's internationally known modification division. This hangar contains a variety of aircraft that PAL is contracted to modify or restore).
Halifax Stanfield International Airport: Provincial Aerospace and PAL Airlines share a hangar in Halifax which houses one of PAL Aerospace's King Air 200 Maritime Surveillance aircraft, another King Air 200 MEDIVAC aircraft and two King Air 350 charter aircraft. The charter department, which operates the King Air 350's, Citation X and other Provincial Airlines aircraft at its disposal, is also located at the Hangar in Halifax.
CFB Comox: The hangar in Comox, British Columbia is part of CFB Comox and is the base of one of Provincial Aerospace's King Air 200 maritime surveillance aircraft and its pilots.
Curaçao International Airport: Provincial has a maritime surveillance base in Curaçao, Kingdom of the Netherlands, where it operates two Dash 8s under contract for the Dutch Government. PAL aircraft in Curaçao use the call signs "Coast Guard" (for routine patrols or search and rescue operations) and "SAM" (which stands for Special Air Missions when on a classified mission which can be launched without filing a flight plan).
Abu Dhabi, UAE: Provincial has pilots and maintenance of two Dash 8s modified by PMMD in the Middle East based in Abu Dhabi, UAE. The crews are not based permanently in Abu Dhabi: they operate on a rotation from Canada. The UAE aircraft use the call sign "Sea Lord".

Cargo 

PAL Airlines offers cargo service to all of its destinations. St. John's and Goose Bay each operate a full cargo facility. The Metroliner is PAL's dedicated cargo aircraft and operate daily cargo flights throughout Newfoundland and Labrador. The Twin Otters also are used for cargo flights along the Labrador Coast. For destinations in the Maritimes and Quebec, cargo is moved on scheduled flights. The Dash 8-100's are also capable of being converted to fly as a passenger/cargo combination.

Charters 
Provincial Aerospace has three aircraft dedicated to charters. The aircraft in the PAL Airlines fleet are also often used for larger charters. PAL has flown charters all over North America and to Africa. Air Borealis also has its own charter division which flies charters along the coast of Labrador and Northern Quebec and specializes in off-strip charters and float operations.

Destinations 
PAL Airlines serves 28 communities in Newfoundland and Labrador, New Brunswick, Nova Scotia, Prince Edward Island, Quebec and Ontario as of December 2, 2022.

Fleet 
As of November 2022 the following aircraft are listed by Transport Canada as being registered to Air Borealis, PAL Airlines, and PAL Aerospace:

Air Borealis
ICAO airline designator: LBR. Telephony: NORTHLIGHT.

Pal Airlines
ICAO airline designator: PVL. Telephony: PROVINCIAL.

Pal Aerospace
ICAO airline designator: SVR. Telephony: SPEEDAIR.

Historical fleet 
Former aircraft flown include:
Britten-Norman Islander
Convair 580
Piper PA-31 Navajo
Piper PA-34 Seneca
Saab 340
Swearingen Merlin

References

External links

PAL Airlines
PAL Aerospace
Air Borealis

Regional airlines of Atlantic Canada
Airlines established in 1974
Companies based in St. John's, Newfoundland and Labrador